And Who Are You? is a 2007 Spanish drama film directed by Antonio Mercero, which stars Manuel Alexandre, Cristina Brondo, and José Luis López Vázquez. The film, Mercero's swan song, tackles the Alzheimer's disease.

Plot 
The film's story is about the Rivero family, which goes on vacation, leaving their daughter Ana, who is studying for a competitive examination, and grandfather Ricardo, in Madrid. Ricardo is accommodated in a nursing home during this period. At the residence, Ricardo meets Andrés, his roommate and new friend, and they reminisce about their youth together, leading to tender and amusing episodes. During the course of the summer, Ricardo is beset by Alzheimer's disease.

Cast

Production 
The filming took place between Madrid and San Sebastián. The film's release date coincided with the international's day of the degenerative disease. During the filming the therapist to whom the film is dedicated to and director's advisor discovered that Mercero had its first symptoms. Mercero would be diagnosed with Alzheimer's disease. It was his last film as well as José Luis López Vázquez'.

Reception 
Televisión Española organized a colloquium about the film after the director's death in 2018.

See also 
 List of Spanish films of 2007

References

External links 
 Trailer and review, 20minutos
 Antonio Mercero habla de ¿Y tú quién eres?, YouTube

Spanish drama films
Films about Alzheimer's disease
2000s Spanish films
2000s Spanish-language films
Films shot in Madrid
Films shot in the Basque Country (autonomous community)
2007 drama films